Highpointing is the activity of ascending to the point with the highest elevation within a given area (the "highpoint"). Examples include climbing the highest point of each U.S. state, reaching the highest point of each county within a specific state, and ascending the highest mountain on each continent (the "Seven Summits").

Overview 
Highpointing takes its adherents to the apex of dangerous and spectacular mountains, but it also leads people to climb much less notable hilltops in pursuit of their goal. An example of this can be found in those who climb the highest point of each U.S. state. This requires ascents not only of Denali and Mount Rainier, two of North America's most impressive peaks, but also to the tops of such states as Delaware (Ebright Azimuth) and Rhode Island (Jerimoth Hill), where most people would contend there are no actual mountains to climb. The heterogeneous nature of these summits is usually considered part of the appeal, as the travel and cultural experiences en route to the climbs are often valued as highly as the climbs themselves.
  
This activity is practiced all around the world, though it seems the most popular in the United States. The most prominent groups of "highpointers" in the U.S. attempt to either climb to the highest point of each state in the U.S. or to the highest point in each county within a specific U.S. state. These activities are called "state" and "county" highpointing, respectively.

Other notable highpointing pursuits include climbing the Seven Summits, ascending to the highest mountain in each country in Europe, and reaching the top of each state or province in one's home country.

Highpointing is related to, but different than peakbagging. Peakbaggers usually climb every peak above a certain height in a specific region (like the Munros, the Colorado Fourteeners, or New Hampshire's 48 four-thousand footers), whereas highpointers would climb just one summit in each region of a larger geographical area.

The goal of many highpointers is to ascend to every highpoint on their list; however, many others undertake highpointing for the experience of climbing as many highpoints as they find enjoyable, with no expectation of doing them all.

History and first ascents 

Starting in the early 20th century, a few pioneers of highpointing began visiting the highest geographic point in each of the 50 U.S. states. In the early days, this endeavor involved dispute and original research, as the tools to precisely map every square inch of the country were just beginning to find widespread use — and this was part of the charm.

The first person to successfully climb each U.S. state highpoint was Arthur H. Marshall, who completed the task in July 1936, when there were only 48 states. Marshall's 48th highpoint to complete the task was Indiana's modest Hoosier Hill. 
Only four individuals are known to have completed all 48 states before the addition of Alaska and Hawaii in 1959.

The first person to climb to the top of all 50 U.S. states was Mitch Michaud in 1970. Since then, about 250 people have successfully climbed to the top of each U.S. state. Mount Everest, by comparison, has seen over 5,000 ascents by more than 3,000 individuals.

In 1986, Jack Longacre placed an ad in Outside magazine which led the next year to the formation of the Highpointers Club, which is devoted to climbs of U.S. state highpoints.

Participation in county highpointing in the U.S. varies widely among states, with few states being climbed by more than a few dozen individuals.

The Seven Summits including Mount Kosciusko was first completed in 1985 by Dick Bass. At least 350 people have climbed all seven since then. There is some dispute over what constitutes Australia's summit: some people climb Mount Kosciuszko, the highest point on the Australian mainland, others climb the more demanding Puncak Jaya, highest point of the Australian continental shelf. In 1986, Canadian Patrick Morrow became the first to complete the Seven Summits with Puncak Jaya. In 1996, Californian David D. Keaton became the first person to complete both versions of the Seven Summits and the 50 U.S. state highpoints.

The first person to climb all of Europe's highpoints was Ginge Fullen in 1999. There were a few revisions of the high points in Europe e.g. Kosovo - Morgan Batt is the first to summit the revised list 2017. Fullen also appears to be the first person to climb the highpoint of every nation in Africa. Since then, a few dozen people have also completed the European highpoints. European highpoint climbers have their task complicated by 1) various definitions of what constitutes the European continent 2) emergence of new nations 3) debate over whether to count the highest points on the mainland of a nation, or the highpoints of islands belonging to it.

Climbs to the tops of each state/province in Canada, Australia, Germany and other countries have also been recorded. In Germany, highpointing is known as "16 gipfel" (referring to the highest points of each of the German states).

To date, no person is known to have reached the highest point in every country in the world. The highest point of Bhutan (Gangkhar Puensum) is closed to the public, and is probably the world's highest unclimbed mountain.

Highpointing guidelines

Rules for this pursuit are few, and ascents are generally defined by the individuals themselves. Highpointing has no formal governing body. The organizational body for state highpointing in the U.S. is the Highpointers Club. However, many Highpoint Guides and Books hold to these general principles:

 Any route to the top - walking, climbing, driving an automobile, etc. - is considered a valid means of attaining the high point. Each individual must decide what constitutes good sport. Many will prefer reaching the high point under their own locomotion, or to climb a certain number of vertical feet en route, but the means of ascent is a personal choice.
 The goal is to attain the highest "natural point." In other words, regardless of what man-made structures have been placed on top, the goal is to stand atop the highest "natural point."
 If the natural high point is covered with a structure and that structure is accessible, even on a limited basis, entering the structure and standing over the presumed high point is the goal. If the structure is completely and permanently inaccessible—e.g. a military base or private telecommunications tower - the goal is to reach the highest accessible natural point.
Some highpoints are open on certain dates only and the Club expects all members to abide by these dates.
If the highest point in a state, county, etc. is located along a boundary, they must be visited. The highest summit within an area, being lower, does not count under such circumstances. The most prominent example of this is found in the state of Connecticut, where the highest point is on the slope of a mountain whose summit is actually in Massachusetts.

U.S. state and territory highpoints

The two most prolific highpointing organizations are the Highpointers Club, whose members aspire to reaching all of the U.S. state highpoints, and the County Highpointers Club, whose members are collectively attempting to reach the highest point in the 3,142 U.S. counties located in the 50 states and District of Columbia. (The County Highpointers Club is not attempting to reach the highest points of the 100 county-equivalents in the U.S. territories).
 
U.S. state highpointers generally consider the recognized highpoints of the 50 U.S. states, but may also include the highpoints of the District of Columbia and the 5 major U.S. territories (American Samoa, Guam, the Northern Mariana Islands, Puerto Rico and the U.S. Virgin Islands). Because of the difficulty of climbing Alaska's Denali, many people only attempt to reach the highpoints of the 48 contiguous states.

In addition to reaching the highest point in each of the 50 U.S. states, some highpointers also ascend Fort Reno Park, the highest point in the District of Columbia, and/or Cerro de Punta, the highest mountain in Puerto Rico. Some also climb the highpoints of other U.S. territories like Mount Lamlam in Guam and Lata Mountain in American Samoa.

Elevations range from 20,310 feet on Alaska's Denali to 345 feet on Florida's Britton Hill. Technically, the U.S. Minor Outlying Islands has the lowest elevation, with the highest elevation being  on Navassa Island. See List of U.S. states and territories by elevation for more information.
 
Difficulty of ascent varies considerably from state to state (or territory). About 20 of the states can be ascended by automobile. Many of the rest can be reached via an easy hike. Only 10 to 20 require serious effort, depending on an individual's fitness and skills. Denali is by far the most difficult, requiring serious training, thousands of dollars, about three weeks, and favorable weather conditions to summit.

While most highpointers view highpointing as a hobby, it is also recognized by many in the mountaineering community. In 1991 a team consisting of Pete Allard, Jim Grace, Shaun Lacher, David Sandway and Dennis Stewart, who called themselves "The Highpoint Hoppers," set the first recognized record for climbing the highest point in each of the lower contiguous states in the fastest time. The team began on the summit of Mount Rainier in Washington at midnight on July 1 and finished on the summit of Gannett Peak in Wyoming on July 31 thus completing their goal of ascending all 48 state highpoints in one calendar month. Their time was 30 days, 10 hours and 52 minutes. For their effort, the Highpoint Hoppers got recognition in the Guinness Book of Records.  Fifteen years later, British climber Jake Meyer broke the speed record for climbing the lower 48 highpoints in 23 days, 19 hours and 31 minutes in 2006. The record stood until American siblings Josh and Lindsay Sanders broke the record in 19 days, 7 hours and 37 minutes in 2015.

County highpoints 

County highpointing, unlike state highpointing, is most popular in the UK and Ireland. There are several guides covering ascents of the counties of England, Ireland, Scotland, and Wales.

Within Great Britain, there are 48 counties in England, 33 in Scotland and 22 in Wales. Most of these "county tops" are non-technical walk-ups. Ireland has 32 counties, however, 10 counties share a highpoint, so there are only 27 unique "county tops". Each nation has seen dozens of people complete their lists. Climbers have been confused in recent years by status changes in the various counties, both adding and subtracting highpoints, depending upon the criteria used.

By contrast, in the United States, there are 3,242 counties, and no one has yet approached climbing all of them. Bob Packard is currently listed as the person with the most county highpoints completed, having ascended to the tops of all the counties of 29 states. Because of the large number of counties in the U.S., most county highpointers narrow the list by aspiring to climb only a certain subset of county highpoints. For instance, many county highpointers only ascend the highpoints of single (or perhaps maybe a few) states. Others may climb only the highest, most prominent, or most difficult county high points.

Rhode Island, a low state with a handful of counties, has seen the most people climb all its counties, with 40 people listed. Several U.S. states and territories have not yet seen ascents of all their counties.

The U.S. county highpointers' club rules are slightly stricter than state highpoint rules.

Many counties, especially flat and low-lying ones, have not been fully surveyed and thus have no single defined highest point, just multiple areas with the same highest contour line. In order to claim to have successfully climbed the county's highest point, then, it is necessary to visit all those areas, unless one can clearly be ruled out by line of sight from another one or by virtue of having been graded or excavated. Even if one area has an elevation indicated on the USGS map, the county highpointer must visit other areas within the same contour until and unless the maximum elevations are resolved by an official survey.
  
For flat counties with multiple points, county highpointing is more akin to  geocaching than peak bagging, since logically only one of the points is the highpoint, and the rest are not. In this case the number of virtual 'caches' is largely an artifact of the size of the contour interval (for a given area, the larger the contour interval, the more 'possible' highpoints there will be). For instance suppose the two highest points in a county are 101 feet and 106 feet above sea level, and that neither has a spot elevation on the map. If the region is mapped with 5-foot contours, there will be only 1 "highpoint". However, if the region is mapped with 10-foot contours, there will be two "highpoints", and county highpointers will be required to visit both points to claim the county.

Notes

See also
Lists of highest points
The Effort Scale of Highpointing the Fifty US States

References

External links

 
Peak bagging
Outdoor locating games
Outdoor recreation